Taniela Sadrugur (born 25 July 1998) is a Fijian professional rugby league footballer who plays as a  or er for the Townsville Blackhawks in the Queensland Cup and Fiji at international level.

Background
He was born in Fiji.

Rugby Sevens career
Sadrugu previously played for the Fiji sevens side at international level in rugby union.

Club career
He is contracted to the North Queensland Cowboys in the NRL.

Playing mainly as a  he scored 7 tries in 15 games for the Townsville Blackhawks in the Queensland Cup in 2022.

International career
In October 2022 Sadrugu was named in the Fiji squad for the 2021 Rugby League World Cup.

In October 2022 Sadrugu made his international début for the Fiji Bati side against England.

References

External links
Townsville Blackhawks profile
North Queensland Cowboys profile
Rakaviti profile
Fiji profile

1998 births
Living people
Rugby league centres
Rugby league second-rows
Rugby league wingers
Fijian rugby league players
Fiji national rugby league team players
Fiji international rugby sevens players
Male rugby sevens players
Townsville Blackhawks players